Arkansas Highway 119 (AR 119, Ark. 119, and Hwy. 119) is a series of state highways that run in Northeast Arkansas. All routes are maintained by the Arkansas Department of Transportation (ArDOT).

Section 0

Highway 119 is a state highway of  that runs in Mississippi County. It begins at an intersection with AR 14 in Marie and heads east. After , it makes a left turn and heads north for about one mile (1.6 km) before turning due east again. It continues east for  before turning south and ending at an intersection with US 61 in Driver.

Major intersections

Section 2

Highway 119 is a  state highway in Mississippi County running from US 61 in Osceola to AR 158 near Victoria. It begins at the intersection of US 61 (North Walnut Street) and West Semmes Avenue. It travels west intersecting the southern terminus of one segment of AR 325 at North Ermen Lane and the northern terminus of AR 119Y. There, it turns north, then west, and north again before crossing over I-55 and terminating at AR 158 outside the community of Victoria.

History
This segment of Highway 119 first appeared on the 1945 state highway map, designated between AR 40 (present-day AR 140) and a junction with AR 158 and AR 181.

Major intersections

Osceola spur

Highway 119Y is a short  spur of AR 119 entirely in Osceola, Mississippi County. It connects an intersection of AR 140 north to section 2 of AR 119.

Major intersections

Sections 4 & 5

Highway 119 is a  state highway in Mississippi County that runs from an intersection with AR 18 in Leachville to the Missouri state line.

Route description
The route runs north through Leachville to an intersection with Highway 77. The two highways form a concurrency heading east to Poplar Corner. The concurrency ends when Highway 77 turns south; Highway 119 heads north for about  before turning east. After one mile (1.6 km), it is in the community of Buckeye and makes a left turn towards the Missouri state line. It travels north for about  before entering the community of Box Elder and ending at the state line. Missouri Supplemental Routes K and Y continue north from the state line and travel to Hornersville, Missouri.

Major intersections
Mile markers reset at concurrencies.

Section 6

Highway 119 is a  state highway entirely in Clay County. The route runs north from an intersection with AR 139 near the community of Leonard to an intersection with US 49 in the city of Rector.

See also
Arkansas Highway 119 (1927–2022) former alignment in Mississippi County

References

External links

119
Transportation in Clay County, Arkansas
Transportation in Mississippi County, Arkansas